Cerva is a surname. Notable people with the surname include:

 Bernardino Cervi or Cerva, Italian painter
 Bernhard Caboga-Cerva (1785–1855), Austrian nobleman
 Elio Lampridio Cerva, Ragusan poet
 Giovan Battista della Cerva (1515–1580), Italian painter
 Giovanni Maria Cerva, Italian painter
 Serafino Cerva (1696–1759), Ragusan encyclopedian

See also

Cerva (disambiguation)
Cervi (surname)

References

surnames